Mwandishi is the ninth album by jazz pianist Herbie Hancock, released in 1971. It is the first album to officially feature Hancock’s ‘Mwandishi’ sextet consisting of saxophonist Bennie Maupin, trumpeter Eddie Henderson, trombonist Julian Priester, bassist Buster Williams and drummer Billy Hart.

Background 

This album is one of Hancock's first departures from the traditional idioms of jazz, as well as the beginning of an original and creative style which eventually appealed to a wider audience, e.g. in his 1973 album Head Hunters. In addition, Mwandishi was Hancock's attempt at continuing the musical principles and styles he explored in his previous experiences with Miles Davis, e.g. on In A Silent Way.  Hancock's previous explorations of jazz fusion included Fat Albert Rotunda, an album related to the TV special ‘’Hey, Hey, Hey, It's Fat Albert’’.

Mwandishi was recorded at Wally Heider Studios Studio C, in San Francisco, California in January 1971, by Hancock's Mwandishi Sextet.  The recording incorporated progressive notions of funk, jazz, and rock.

The tracks on Mwandishi include "Ostinato," the time signature of which is 15/8, "You'll Know When You Get There," and "Wandering Spirit Song."  "Wandering Spirit Song" features Hancock's extensive use of tension and release, in which he builds the tension of the song by crescendos and an increasing number of musical voices, and then releases the tension with long held chords on his synthesizer.

 ("composer") is the Swahili name Hancock adopted during the late 1960s and early 1970s. The members of the Sextet each adopted a Swahili name:  ("player," someone who plays a game) for Buster Williams,  ("strong as a rock") for Billy Hart,  ("doctor," whose traditional functions include exorcism, prophecy, and the removal of spells) for Eddie Henderson, Mwile ("body", from Swahili ) for Bennie Maupin, 

Release history 

Mwandishi, along with Fat Albert Rotunda and Crossings, was reissued in one set as Mwandishi: The Complete Warner Bros. Recordings in 1994  and as The Warner Bros. Years (1969-1972) in 2014.

Track listing
All songs composed by Herbie Hancock except where noted.

Personnel
 Mwandishi / Herbie Hancock – Fender Rhodes piano
 Mchezaji / Buster Williams – bass
 Jabali / Billy Hart – drums
 Mganga / Eddie Henderson – trumpet, flugelhorn
 Mwile / Bennie Maupin – bass clarinet, alto flute, piccolo
 Pepo Mtoto / Julian Priester – tenor trombone, bass trombone
with
 Leon "Ndugu" Chancler – drums and percussion  on "Ostinato (Suite For Angela)"
 José "Chepito" Areas – congas and timbales on "Ostinato (Suite For Angela)"
Ronnie Montrose – guitar on "Ostinato (Suite For Angela)"

References 

1971 albums
Herbie Hancock albums
Warner Records albums
Albums produced by Dave Rubinson
Albums recorded at Van Gelder Studio
Albums recorded at Wally Heider Studios
Jazz fusion albums by American artists
Concept albums